The Super League Grand Final is the championship-deciding game of rugby league's Super League competition. It is played between two teams who have qualified via the Super League Play-Off series. The winning team receives the Super League Trophy and goes on to play the NRL champions in the World Club Challenge. The Harry Sunderland Trophy is awarded to the man of the match. The match is normally played at Old Trafford in Greater Manchester.

Only 4 clubs have won the Super League, as of 2022 - St Helens (10), Leeds Rhinos (8), Wigan Warriors (5), and Bradford Bulls (4).

(St Helens and Bradford Bulls each won one of their Super League titles before the Play Off and Grand Final system was introduced in 1998).

St Helens are the current champions, after winning the 2022 Super League Grand Final.  They became the first team to win 4 consecutive grand finals.

History

Use of a play-off system to decide the Championship brought back a rugby league tradition that had fallen out of use in the 1970s, 1980s, and 1990s. The Super League Premiership replaced the Championship final but it was to decide the Premiership winners, not the Championship winners. The Premiership was discontinued after the introduction of the Super League play-off series in 1998.

The Super League Grand Final was introduced for the 1998 season. The inaugural Grand Final match was played that year on Saturday 24 October, between Wigan and Leeds.

Venue

The Grand Final has been held at Old Trafford in Manchester every year since 1998, except in 2020, when it was held at the KCOM Stadium in Hull due to the COVID-19 pandemic.

Trophy

The winners of the Super League collect the Grand Final rings and the team's name, captain and year are engraved into the trophy. The winners also collect £100,000 with the runner up collecting £50,000.
 
. Leeds captain Kevin Sinfield currently holds the record for captaining the most Super League title winning sides after captaining Leeds to 7 of their grand final successes. St Helens contested the final 6 years in a row (from 2006 until 2011) during which time they succeeded only once in lifting the trophy against Hull F.C. in 2006; after which they suffered consecutive defeats against Leeds in 2007, 2008, 2009, Wigan in 2010 and Leeds once again in 2011.

Awards

The Harry Sunderland Trophy is awarded to the Man-of-the-Match in the Super League Grand Final by the Rugby League Writers' Association. Named after Harry Sunderland, who was an Australian rugby league football administrator in both Australia and the United Kingdom, the Trophy was first awarded in the Rugby Football League Championship Final of the 1964–65 season following Sunderland's death.

Finals

The Super League Grand Final has been the championship-deciding game since Super League III in 1998: This final is held at Old Trafford.

Results

The Double

In rugby league, the term 'the Double' is referring to the achievement of a club that wins the top division and Challenge Cup in the same season. To date, this has been achieved by ten clubs, four of them during the Super League era.

The Treble

The Treble refers to the team who wins all three domestic honours on offer during the season; Grand Final, League Leaders' Shield and Challenge Cup. To date seven teams have won the treble, only Bradford Bulls, St Helens and Leeds Rhinos have won the treble in the Super League era.

The Quadruple

The Quadruple refers to winning the Super League, League Leaders' Shield, Challenge Cup and World Club Challenge in one season.

Pre match Headliners

2011- Feeder were cancelled due to Manchester United not wanting a stage to be erected on the wet pitch

Records

Match Records
Largest margin of victory:
31 Points -  Bradford 37-6  Wigan (2001)
Smallest margin of victory: 
1 Point -  St Helens 19-18  Bradford (2002)
Highest scoring:
48 Points -  Leeds 32-16  St Helens (2011)
Lowest scoring: 
12 Points -  St Helens 8-4  Wigan (2020)

Highest attendance:
73,512  Leeds v  Wigan (at Old Trafford, 2015)

Club Records 

 Most Grand Final victories:

9 -  St. Helens (1999, 2000, 2002, 2006, 2014, 2019, 2020, 2021, 2022)

 Most consecutive Grand Final victories:

4 -  St. Helens (2019, 2020, 2021, 2022)

 Most Grand Final appearances:

14 -   St Helens (1999, 2000, 2002, 2006, 2007, 2008, 2009, 2010, 2011, 2014, 2019, 2020, 2021, 2022)

 Most Grand Final defeats:

6 -   Wigan (2000, 2001, 2003, 2014, 2015, 2020)

 Most Grand Final defeats (without victory):

4 -  Warrington Wolves (2012, 2013, 2016, 2018)

Player Records
 Most Grand Final appearances: 
11:
 Jamie Peacock (2001, 2002, 2003, 2004, 2005, 2007, 2008, 2009, 2011, 2012, 2015)

 James Roby  (2006, 2007, 2008, 2009, 2010, 2011, 2014, 2019, 2020, 2021, 2022)

Most Grand Final victories:
9:
 Jamie Peacock (2001, 2003, 2005, 2007, 2008, 2009, 2011, 2012, 2015)

 Most Grand Final appearances as captain: 
8:
 Kevin Sinfield (2004, 2005, 2007, 2008, 2009, 2011, 2012, 2015)

 Youngest finalist: 
Leon Pryce (18 years)

Youngest winner:
Jack Walker (18 years, 60 days)

 Oldest finalist:
Sean O'Loughlin (38 years, 3 days)

Oldest winner:
Jamie Peacock (37 years, 300 days)

See also

Championship Grand Final
Million Pound Game
Super League
Super League play-offs
Old Trafford
Super League Trophy
Harry Sunderland Trophy
NRL Grand Final

References

External links

 
Grand final
1998 establishments in England
Recurring sporting events established in 1998
October sporting events